The Twin may refer to:

The Twin (album), a 2017 album by Sound of Ceres
 The Twin (EP), an EP by The Twin alias Boy George
The Twin (1984 film), a 1984 French comedy film
 The Twin (2017 film), a 2017 American horror film
 The Twin (2022 film), a Finnish horror film
 The Twin (novel), a 2006 novel by Gerbrand Bakker

See also
 Twin (disambiguation)
Twins (disambiguation)